Winnie the Pooh (also known as Pooh Bear, or simply Pooh) is a fictional bear created by English author A. A. Milne and English artist and book illustrator E. H. Shepard, is one of the most popular characters adapted for film and television by The Walt Disney Company. Disney first received certain licensing rights to the Winnie the Pooh stories, characters, and trademarks from Stephen Slesinger, Inc. and the estate of A. A. Milne in 1961.

Adaptation and development by Disney
In 1961, Walt Disney Productions licensed certain film and other rights to the Winnie-the-Pooh characters, stories and trademarks from Stephen Slesinger, Inc. and the estate of A. A. Milne. and made a series of animated films about him.  These early films were based on several of the original stories and the distinctive artwork made popular by Stephen Slesinger, Inc. during the 1930s through the 1960s. Alongside the animated versions, which Disney adapted from Slesinger, Slesinger's simplified lines and pastel color adaptations of Shepard's original illustrations are now marketed under the description "Classic Pooh".

In 1977, Disney released the animated feature film The Many Adventures of Winnie the Pooh, introducing a new character named Gopher (which Gopher acknowledges by proclaiming, "I'm not in the book, you know").  The film constitutes three stories originally released as separate featurettes: Winnie the Pooh and the Honey Tree (1966), Winnie the Pooh and the Blustery Day (1968), and Winnie the Pooh and Tigger Too (1974). The 1977 release featured new bridging material and a new ending.  A fourth featurette, Winnie the Pooh and a Day for Eeyore, was released in 1983.

The live-action TV series Welcome to Pooh Corner ran on the Disney Channel from 1983 to 1986. In 1988, Disney launched an animated TV series The New Adventures of Winnie the Pooh, which aired from 1988 to 1991 with a total of 83 episodes. Pooh appeared with Tigger in the anti-drug animated TV special Cartoon All-Stars to the Rescue.

In 2000, Disney released the feature film The Tigger Movie in which the character of Tigger played the leading role. Due to its success, two more feature-length Pooh movies based on other characters were released to theaters: Piglet's Big Movie in 2003 and Pooh's Heffalump Movie in 2005. Pooh also made appearances in episodes of the animated series House of Mouse, however he doesn't have any speaking lines and is mostly seen in the background.

Disney, along with Shadow Projects produced a puppet TV series for preschoolers, called The Book of Pooh which aired on Playhouse Disney from 2001 to 2003. Disney produced another series for preschoolers, called My Friends Tigger & Pooh, which aired on Playhouse Disney from 2007 to 2010 and done in CGI. Pooh also makes a cameo appearance in the DreamWorks animated film, Bee Movie along with Piglet, at one point, a man spies Pooh and Piglet eating honey and Barry tells him to "take him out" with a tranquilizer dart.

Winnie the Pooh was released in 2011. In April 2015, Deadline reported that Disney would develop a live action Winnie the Pooh movie with Brigham Taylor producing and Alex Ross Perry writing. The film focuses both on Pooh and the adult Christopher Robin returning to the Hundred Acre Woods and his reunion with Pooh and friends. Christopher Robin was released on August 3, 2018 by Walt Disney Studios Motion Pictures in the United States.

Casting history
Sterling Holloway was the original voice of Pooh, starting with the 1966 theatrical featurette, Winnie the Pooh and the Honey Tree, although the Disneyland Records version was actually released in 1965. Holloway continued to voice the character for over a decade, which included the next two theatrical featurettes, Winnie the Pooh and the Blustery Day (1968) and Winnie the Pooh and Tigger Too (1974), as well as several albums for Disneyland Records. Holloway's last performance as Pooh was for the bridging material in The Many Adventures of Winnie the Pooh (1977).

Hal Smith, who also voiced Owl in the original theatrical featurettes, took over as the voice of Pooh in 1977, starting with the Disney Read-Along adaptation of Winnie the Pooh and Tigger Too. His first performance as Pooh in animation was for the 1981 short, Winnie the Pooh Discovers the Seasons. He would continue to voice Pooh regularly for various projects up until the late 1980s, which included the theatrical featurette Winnie the Pooh and a Day for Eeyore (1983) and the TV series Welcome to Pooh Corner.

Jim Cummings was chosen to voice the character for the 1988 TV series, The New Adventures of Winnie the Pooh. Cummings has since become the official voice for the character, having voiced him in various TV series, video games, and movies, including the 2018 live-action film, Christopher Robin.

Disney Parks
Pooh is a common character in the Disney Parks and the most common in the Winnie the Pooh franchise. He is also usually seen with Tigger and Eeyore, and occasionally Piglet, and is located in Fantasyland.

In the Sorcerers of the Magic Kingdom attraction, Pooh has his own spell card known as "Winnie the Pooh's Honey Bees." Pooh also has his own show in Disneyland Paris, called "Winnie the Pooh and Friends, too!." In the same park, Pooh takes part on his own float in Disney Magic on Parade.

In the 2015 rendition of World of Color, Pooh made a cameo appearance during the opening sequence, in honor of Walt Disney.

Ownership controversy and changes
During his lifetime, Milne was liberal with his grant of rights. At times he licensed the same exclusive rights to more than one entity.

In the United States, E. P. Dutton and Company acquired exclusive volume publication rights and Stephen Slesinger, Inc., acquired sole and exclusive rights to virtually all uses outside of the Dutton books as well as rights to any sorts of future uses. Beginning in 1930 Stephen Slesinger created all of the distinctive and colorful images of Pooh outside of the books. Under license from Slesinger, Pooh made his debuts in radio, film, animation, children's theatre, advertising and a host of consumer products and services protected by trademark. Outside of the U.S. and Canada, Milne retained most of his literary copyright rights which he left to four beneficiaries of his trust:  The Garrick Club, Westminster School, The Royal Literary Fund and the A. A. Milne Family. By direction of Milne's will, the Pooh Properties Trust was formed. Mrs. Milne, trustee of the Milne Estate, and Spencer Curtis Brown, Trustee, licensed certain exclusive film rights to Disney in 1961. Christopher Robin Milne sold his rights to the other copyright holders, in order to raise money to support his daughter, before his death in 1996.

Sometime around 2000, the Pooh Properties Trust licensed additional rights to Disney and accepted a buyout of their claims to royalties as defined in a 1991 lawsuit brought by Stephen Slesinger, Inc. Although Slesinger's rights are arguably more valuable, the combined value paid by Disney to The Pooh Properties Trust is said to be approximately $300 million for Milne's portion of those rights.

To further minimize Disney's legal exposure to Slesinger, Disney paid money to the Pooh Properties attorneys and trusts to use the name of Clare Milne, daughter of Christopher Robin, in an attempt to terminate certain of the copyright rights of Stephen Slesinger Inc, in the wake of the Sonny Bono Copyright Term Extension Act of 1998. The district court found in favor of Stephen Slesinger, Inc., as did the U.S. Court of Appeals for the Ninth Circuit. On June 26, 2006, the U.S. Supreme Court refused to hear the case, thus sustaining the Appeals Court ruling.

In December 2005, Disney announced that Pooh's friend and owner Christopher Robin would be replaced as Pooh's main friend by a six-year-old "tomboyish" red-haired girl Darby for the Disney Channel animated television series, My Friends Tigger & Pooh. Christopher Robin appeared intermittently in the series.

Awards and honors
In 2002, TV Guide compiled a list of the 50 greatest cartoon characters of all time as part of the magazine's 50th anniversary. Winnie the Pooh was given the honor of number 27.

On April 11, 2006, Pooh was honored with a star on the Hollywood Walk of Fame, being the fourth Disney character to receive one after Mickey Mouse, Snow White and Donald Duck. The star is located on 6834 Hollywood Blvd.

Controversies in China

Winnie the Pooh has been used in political satire and has created controversies in China since 2013. In that year, critics compared an image of Pooh and his friend Tigger to a picture of Chinese leader Xi Jinping and US president Barack Obama, who met at the G20 in Saint Petersburg, Russia.

Cartoons of Xi as Winnie the Pooh were regarded as disrespectful, but they continued to be used by critics. Dissident Liu Xiaobo and his wife Liu Xia were photographed holding Pooh mugs as an act of protest. Some commentators have speculated that the movie Christopher Robin has been banned in China as a result of these controversies.

Filmography

Theatrical shorts
 Winnie the Pooh and the Honey Tree (1966) - Sterling Holloway
 Winnie the Pooh and the Blustery Day (1968) - Sterling Holloway
 Winnie the Pooh and Tigger Too (1974) - Sterling Holloway
 Winnie the Pooh Discovers the Seasons (1981) - Hal Smith
 Winnie the Pooh and a Day for Eeyore (1983) - Hal Smith

Feature-length films 
 The Many Adventures of Winnie the Pooh (1977) - Sterling Holloway
 Pooh's Grand Adventure: The Search for Christopher Robin (1997) DVD - Jim Cummings
 A Valentine for You (1999) DVD - Jim Cummings
 Seasons of Giving (1999) DVD - Jim Cummings
 The Tigger Movie (2000) - Jim Cummings
 The Book of Pooh: Stories from the Heart (2001) DVD - Jim Cummings
 Mickey's Magical Christmas: Snowed in at the House of Mouse (2001) DVD - Jim Cummings
 Mickey's House of Villains (2002) DVD - Jim Cummings
 A Very Merry Pooh Year (2002) DVD - Jim Cummings
 Piglet's Big Movie (2003) - Jim Cummings
 Springtime with Roo (2004) DVD - Jim Cummings
 Pooh's Heffalump Movie (2005) - Jim Cummings
 Pooh's Heffalump Halloween Movie (2005) DVD - Jim Cummings
 Winnie the Pooh (2011) - Jim Cummings
 Christopher Robin (2018) - Jim Cummings
 Chip 'n Dale: Rescue Rangers (2022) - Jim Cummings (bootleg version)

Television series
 Welcome to Pooh Corner (1983–1986) - Hal Smith
 The New Adventures of Winnie the Pooh (1988–1991) - Jim Cummings
 House of Mouse (2001-2003) - Jim Cummings
 The Book of Pooh (2001–2004) - Jim Cummings
 My Friends Tigger & Pooh (2007–2010) - Jim Cummings
 Doc McStuffins (2017) (guest appearance) - Jim Cummings
 Monsters at Work (2021) (brief cameo)
 Playdate With Winnie The Pooh (2024) - Jim Cummings

Television specials
 Winnie the Pooh and Christmas Too (1991) - Jim Cummings
 Boo to You Too! Winnie the Pooh (1996) - Jim Cummings
 A Winnie the Pooh Thanksgiving (1998) - Jim Cummings
 A Valentine for You (1999) - Jim Cummings

See also
List of Winnie-the-Pooh characters

References

External links
 Winnie-the-Pooh (2011) at Internet Movie Database

Winnie the Pooh (franchise)
Winnie-the-Pooh characters
Film characters introduced in 1966
Anthropomorphic bears
Works banned in China
Walt Disney Animation Studios characters